No. 1 was a  of the Imperial Japanese Navy during the Pacific War. Completed in early 1944, the ship was used as a convoy escort on one successful mission to resupply Imperial Japanese Army units on Saipan. On the return trip, No. 1 was badly damaged by American aircraft and towed to Palau. Redesignated as an anti-aircraft ship, she was sunk by American bombers in July 1944.

Design
No.1-class landing ships were designed as fast amphibious assault ships that could rapidly land troops, vehicles, and cargo. Displacing 1,500 tons at standard load, they were powered by one Kampon geared turbine. It drove one shaft using steam provided by two Kampon  water-tube boilers. No. 1 was capable of carrying four Daihatsu landing craft; it could also hold seven Type 2 Ka-Mi amphibious tanks or two Kō-hyōteki-class submarines in its hull.

The No.1-class ships were heavily armed; the main armament consisted of a  Type 89 DP gun in a twin-gun mount, as well as ten  Type 96 anti-aircraft guns in three triple, one twin and four single mounts. Forty-two depth charges were also fit on the ships for use by four throwers. No. 1 was fitted with Type 22 search radar; for anti-submarine duties, it was also fit with Type 93 sonar and Type 93 hydrophones.

History
No. 1 was laid down at Kure Naval Arsenal on 5 November 1943 and launched on 8 February 1944.  On 10 May, No. 1, with Lieutenant Commander Shinbori Masao in command, was completed and assigned to the Yokosuka Guard Force. On 29 May, No. 1 departed from Tokyo with the torpedo boat  and three submarine chasers to escort convoy No. 3530 to Saipan, consisting of nine transports carrying troops of the Imperial Japanese Army's 43rd Infantry Division as well as regular supplies. During the journey, No. 1 served as an anti-submarine vessel, conducting sweeps between 1 June to 6 June, but these did not deter American submarines, which sank five transports of the convoy in that time period. On 11 June, the convoy finally arrived at Saipan, but was forced to flee due to the invasion of the island by the United States Marine Corps.

On 13 June, while sailing between Ulithi and Guam, the convoy was attacked by Grumman F6F Hellcat fighter-bombers of Task Force 58, severely damaging No. 1 and disabling her power and navigation functions. Following five days of drifting, the ship was towed to Palau by the transport Akishima Maru on 18 June. After a month of refitting, No. 1 was deployed as a floating anti-aircraft battery off the north shore of Ngargol Island; to camouflage the ship, it was furnished with trees and branches in order to blend in with the shoreline. On 26 July, during an American air attack on Palau, six Curtiss SB2C Helldiver bombers from  attacked No. 1; they claimed one bomb hit and five near-misses. Fatally damaged by four bombs, No. 1 broke in half and sank near . The ship was stricken from the navy list on 10 September 1944.

References

No. 1
No. 1
No. 1
No. 1
No. 1
No. 1
No.1